Archibald McDiarmid (December 8, 1881 – August 11, 1957) was a Canadian track and field athlete born in Balvicar, Scotland who competed in the 1920 Summer Olympics. 

In 1920 he finished fourth in the 56 pound weight throw competition and ninth in the hammer throw event.  McDiarmid was the flag-bearer for Canada at the 1920 Olympics.  He finished sixth in the 1930 British Empire Games hammer throw.

References

1881 births
1957 deaths
Canadian male hammer throwers
Olympic track and field athletes of Canada
Athletes (track and field) at the 1920 Summer Olympics
Commonwealth Games competitors for Canada
Athletes (track and field) at the 1930 British Empire Games
Scottish emigrants to Canada
Sportspeople from Argyll and Bute
Olympic weight throwers